Live is the first live album by the Gipsy Kings, released in 1992 in Europe and the US. Both versions of the release are identical. Apart from "Intro", newly released on this album are the songs "Odeon" and "Fandango".

, the album has sold 247,000 copies in the US.

Track listing

Personnel 
Gipsy Kings
 Nicolas Reyes - lead vocals, acoustic guitar
 Canut Reyes - backing vocals, acoustic guitar
 Andre Reyes - backing vocals, acoustic guitar
 Diego Baliardo - acoustic guitar
 Paco Baliardo - acoustic guitar
 Tonino Baliardo - soloist acoustic guitar

Supporting Musicians
 Gerard Prevost - bass guitar
 Negrito Trasante-Grocco - drums
 Dominique Droin - keyboards
 Charles Benarrock - percussion

References

External links
Live! at gipsykings.net

1992 albums
Elektra Records live albums
Gipsy Kings albums